The women's 100 metre butterfly competition at the 1999 Pan Pacific Swimming Championships took place on August 22–23 at the Sydney International Aquatic Centre.  The last champion was Jenny Thompson of US.

This race consisted of two lengths of the pool, all in butterfly.

Records
Prior to this competition, the existing world and Pan Pacific records were as follows:

Results
All times are in minutes and seconds.

Heats
The first round was held on August 22.

Semifinals
The semifinals were held on August 22.

Final 
The final was held on August 23.

References

1999 Pan Pacific Swimming Championships
1999 in women's swimming